A text is deemed Joycean when it is reminiscent of the writings of James Joyce, particularly Ulysses or  Finnegans Wake. Joycean fiction exhibits a high degree of verbal play, usually within the framework of stream of consciousness.  Works that are "Joycean" may also be technically eclectic, employing multiple technical shifts as a form of thematic or subject development.  In this latter respect, it is not merely an opaque or evident technique, such as is characteristic of avant garde prose, but technical shifts that are meant to be recognized by the reader and considered as part of the narrative itself.  More than anything, however, Joycean has come to denote a form of extreme verbal inventiveness which tends to push the English language towards multi-lingual polysemy or impenetrability.  Joycean word play frequently seeks to imply linguistic and literary history on a single plane of communication.  It therefore denies readers the simple denotative message traditional in prose in favor of the ambiguity and equivocal signification of poetry.

This is one of a whole series of adjectives based on authors' names, such as Brechtian, Kafkaesque, Maloufian, Orwellian, Pinteresque and Shavian.

References

James Joyce